Agonges is a commune in the Allier department in the Auvergne-Rhône-Alpes region of central France.

The inhabitants of the commune are known as Agongeois or Agongeoises.

Geography 
Agonges is located some 15 km north-west of Moulins and 50 km south of Nevers. It can be accessed by several roads: the D58 from Saint-Menoux in the south passes through the village and continues north, the D133 comes from the D953 in the south-west to the village and continues north-east to Bagneux, the D54 comes from Franchesse in the north-west to the village then continues east to join the D13, the D139 comes from Couzon in the north to join the D54 in the commune, and the D13 passes through the north-eastern corner of the commune. The commune consists entirely of farmland with numerous hamlets other than the village.

The hamlets are:

Chateau de Beaumont
Chateau de Breuil
Chateau du Monceau
Fontenay
Grand Langeron
Grand Monceau
La Coulette
La Croix Peyre
La Loire
La Raymonerie
La Vallette
Lafont
Lalue
L'Augere
Lavault
Le Breuron
Le Lieu Jobier
Le Moulin Rateau
Le Pingon
Le Plaix
Les Brosses
Les Carrons
Les Fourches
Les Regnauds
Les Sacrots
Les Sodais
Les Tarnissats
Petit Langeron
Petit Monceau
Retif

The Ours river flows through the commune from the south passing west of the village and continuing north to join the Burge which forms part of the northern border. There are small lakes in the north of the commune that link to the Burge. The Burge continues north to join the Allier south of Le Port Barreau.

Neighbouring communes and villages

History 
In 1807 the former commune of Breuil merged with Agonges.

Administration 

List of Successive Mayors of Agonges

Population

Culture and heritage

Civil heritage 
The commune has a number of buildings and structures that are registered as historical monuments:
The Chateau of Sacrots (17th century)
The Chateau of La Pommeraye (15th century) is in a manor park from the 18th century equipped with round towers in the style of the 15th century.
The Chateau of Augère (Middle Ages) has a medieval dungeon covered with a roof extended by a Gothic building in the 19th century and still has a moat.
The Domain of Epine (15th century), a rare example of a fortified domain from the 14th century in Bourbonnais.
The Chateau of Echardons (1792) was rebuilt in 1792 and it remains the only castle with two towers and a dovecote.
The Chateau of Beaumont (1740) was rebuilt in 1740 on the site of a fortified castle of which only a tower and a dovecote remain.
The Chateau of Beaumont Park (20th century)
The Chateau of Echardons Park (20th century). The park is centred on a lane from the early 20th century.
The Park of La Tuilerie
The Park of La Pommeraie (20th century)
The Saulneraie Garden
The Laugère Park (19th century)

Châteaux Picture Gallery

Religious heritage 
The Church of Notre-Dame (12th century) is registered as an historical monument. It contains a Bronze Bell (1578) that is registered as an historical object.

Church of Notre Dame Picture Gallery

Notable People linked to the commune 
 François Dalphonse (1756-1821), politician, MP for Allier, owner of Beaumont Castle where he died
 Jean Bardin, radio host

See also 
 Communes of the Allier department

External links 
 Agonges on the old National Geographic Institute website 
 Agonges on Géoportail, National Geographic Institute (IGN) website 
 Agonges on the 1750 Cassini Map
 High-resolution 360° Panoramas and Images of The Church of Notre-Dame | Art Atlas

References 

Communes of Allier
Bourbonnais